Birinci Qazaxlar (known as Qazaxlar until 2015) is a village in the Nəzirli municipality (Şatırlı) of the Barda District of Azerbaijan.

References

Populated places in Barda District